Kepler-1708b (previously known as KIC 7906827.01) is a Jupiter-sized exoplanet orbiting the Sun-like star Kepler-1708, located in the constellation of Cygnus approximately 5,600 light years away from Earth. It was first detected in 2011 by NASA's Kepler mission using the transit method, but was not identified as a candidate planet until 2019. In 2021, a candidate Neptune-sized exomoon in orbit around Kepler-1708b was found by astronomer David Kipping and colleagues in an analysis using Kepler transit data.

Characteristics

Mass and radius 
Kepler-1708b is a gas giant planet slightly smaller than Jupiter in size, with a radius of 0.89 Jupiter radii. The mass of the planet remains yet to be measured; precise analysis of its transit timings place a 2-sigma upper limit of <4.6 Jupiter masses. This mass upper limit predicts a maximum radial velocity amplitude of <—although within reach of the most precise spectrographs available, the faintness of Kepler-1708b's host star would make observations difficult.

Orbit and temperature 
Kepler-1708b orbits about 1.64 astronomical units from its host star and completes one revolution every , similar to the orbit of Mars in the Solar System. The eccentricity of its orbit is unmeasured and is given a 2-sigma upper limit of <0.40.

Host star 
Kepler-1708b orbits around the Sun-like star Kepler-1708, located in the constellation of Cygnus  light years away from Earth. At an apparent magnitude of 16, this star is too faint to be seen by the naked eye. The star's celestial coordinates based on the J2000 epoch are: RA , Dec . The European Space Agency's Gaia satellite has measured a stellar parallax of  milliarcseconds (mas) and directional proper motion components of RA , Dec . Kepler-1708 is known by other designations from various star catalogues including: UCAC4 669-077544, KIC 7906827, TIC 272716898, 2MASS J19471778+4337295, WISE J194717.78+433729.2, and Gaia DR2 2078801971283008128.

Based on these properties, Kepler-1708 is likely an F-type main sequence star with a Sun-like metallicity of [Fe/H] =  and an age of  billion years.

Potential exomoon 

In 2021, David Kipping and colleagues performed a search for exomoons around cool, long-period gas giant exoplanets using Kepler photometric data. Out of a sample of 70 exoplanets analyzed, only Kepler-1708b exhibited signs of an orbiting exomoon manifesting as faint, secondary transits accompanying the planet's transits. This possible exomoon, designated Kepler-1708b I, appears to measure below the size of Neptune at 2.6 times Earth's radius. It likely orbits coplanar to its host planet from a distance up to 12 planetary radii—comparable to the distance between Jupiter and its moon Europa, or twice the Earth–Moon distance. The extraordinarily large size of Kepler-1708b I is reminiscent of Kepler-1625b I, another Neptune-sized exomoon candidate previously reported by Kipping et al. in 2017.

Additional observations are necessary to confirm or refute the exomoon's existence—only two transits by Kepler-1708b and its possible exomoon have been observed, and no transit timing variations can be determined as of yet. Kipping et al. determine that the probability of detecting one false positive exomoon in the studied sample of 70 exoplanets was <50%. A follow up study suggested Kepler-1708b I is likely undetectable with the Hubble Space Telescope, but the James Webb Space Telescope should be able to confirm or refute its existence.

See also 
 Kepler-1625b
 2MASS J11193254–1137466 AB
 PDS 70
 V1400 Centauri

Notes

References

External links 
 Astronomers Find Evidence for a Second Supermoon Beyond Our Solar System, Kim Martineau, Columbia News, Columbia University, 13 January 2022
 KIC 7906827 – Kepler Time Series Visualizer NASA Exoplanet Archive, Infrared Processing and Analysis Center
 Planet Kepler-1708 b, The Extrasolar Planets Encyclopaedia, last updated 14 January 2022

Exoplanets discovered in 2022
Exoplanets discovered by the Kepler space telescope
Transiting exoplanets
Cygnus (constellation)